Alport may refer to:

Places

 Alport, a hamlet in Derbyshire, England
 River Alport, in Derbyshire, England
 Alport Castles, a landslip feature in Derbyshire, England
 Alport Height, a hill in Derbyshire, England
Alport, a hamlet near Church Stoke in Powys, Wales
 Alport, Ontario, a town in Ontario, Canada
 Alport Town, a former district of Manchester, England

Other

 Alport syndrome, a genetic disorder
 Arthur Cecil Alport, the discoverer of Alport syndrome
 Cuthbert Alport, Baron Alport, a British politician

See also 
 Allport (disambiguation)